Lasiodiamesa is a genus of flies belonging to the family Chironomidae.

The species of this genus are found in Europe and Northern America.

Species:
 Lasiodiamesa arietina (Coquillett, 1908) 
 Lasiodiamesa armata Brundin, 1966

References

Chironomidae